Punk Vacation is a 1990 American action film directed by Stanley Lewis. It stars Roxanne Rogers, Rob Garrison, Sandra Bogan, Don Martin, and Louis Waldon.

Cast
 Roxanne Rogers as Ramrod
 Rob Garrison as Bobby
 Sandra Bogan as Lisa
 Don Martin as Deputy Sheriff Don
 Louis Waldon as Sheriff Virgil
 Stephen Fiachi as Deputy Sheriff Reed

Production
Punk Vacation was filmed around 1984 and completed in 1987.

Critical reception
Brian Orndorf of Blu-ray.com wrote that Punk Vacation "is undeniably amusing, tickling in a manner only ragtag nonsense can", calling it "a clean, mean machine of goofballery with a distinct period perspective, and while a viewing requires heavy lifting in the tolerance department, the reward is a generous serving of schlock that never bores or fails to amaze with its creative limitations." Annie Choi of Bleeding Skull! wrote that the film "languishes into a mediocre-at-best revenge story with no defining insanity. There are no moments that excite, stun, amuse, or even confuse." She criticized the lack of "wild antics" from the punk characters, as well as the lack of punk music in the film, writing: "Clearly, one-time director Stanley Lewis had never seen a punk in his life."

Home media
The film was released on VHS in 1990. On July 9, 2013, the film was released on DVD and Blu-ray by Vinegar Syndrome. On May 31, 2022 a limited re-release of the film on VHS was put out by Vinegar Syndrome and Lunchmeat.

References

External links
 
 

1990 action films
1990 films
American action films
Punk films
Films shot in California
1990s English-language films
1990s American films